Hannu Touru (born 1952) is a Finnish football manager. In 1991 Touru was elected as the manager of the year by the Finnish Football Association. He still remains the highest achieving manager in the history of FF Jaro, where he has coached during three spells and seven seasons.

Touru has an education as an electrical engineer however he has not practised the trade since he became a professional manager at the age of 37.

References

Living people
1952 births
Finnish football managers
Rauman Pallo football managers
FF Jaro managers
Vaasan Palloseura managers
Sportspeople from Turku